Larry C. Merkley (born c. 1943) is a Canadian curler from Penetanguishene, Ontario.

As a youth, Merkley played hockey for the Midland Bruins, winning the "Canadian Little NHL bantam title" in 1953. He also played baseball for the Midland Indians. 

Merkley works for the Penetanguishene Mental Health Centre.

Teams

References

External links
 
 Larry Merkley – Curling Canada Stats Archive
 Hurry Hard: The Russ Howard Story | Google Books (page 36)

Living people
Canadian male curlers
Curlers from Simcoe County
World curling champions
Brier champions
People from Penetanguishene
1940s births